Dorcas Shiveka Muronji, known as Dorcas Shiveka, is a Kenyan footballer who plays as a defender for Kenyan Women's Premier League club Thika Queens and the Kenya women's national team.

Club career
Shiveka has captained Eldoret Falcons FC in Kenya. She joined Thika Queens in 2021.

International career
Shiveka was capped for Kenya at senior level during the 2020 Turkish Women's Cup.

See also
List of Kenya women's international footballers

References

Year of birth missing (living people)
Living people
Kenyan women's footballers
Women's association football defenders
Kenya women's international footballers